The following radio stations broadcast on AM frequency 1420 kHz: 1420 AM is a Regional broadcast frequency.

Argentina
 LRI220 in Ciudad Autonoma de Buenos Aires

Mexico
 XEEW-AM in Matamoros, Tamaulipas
 XEF-AM in Ciudad Juárez, Chihuahua
 XEH-AM in Monterrey, licensed in San Nicolás de los Garza, Nuevo León
 XEXX-AM in Tijuana, Baja California

United States

References

Lists of radio stations by frequency